Stern is a surname which can be of either German/Yiddish or English language origin, though the former case predominates.

The English version of the surname was used as a nickname for someone who was strict, austere, harsh, or stern in character.   The German/Yiddish word Stern means "star".

People
 Adam Stern (born 1980), Canadian Major League Baseball player
 Adam Stern (conductor) (born 1955), American conductor
 Adolf Stern (1835–1907), German literary historian and poet
 Adolf Stern (chess player) (1849–1907), German chess player
 Adolphe Stern (1848–1931), Romanian lawyer and politician
 Alan Stern (born 1957), American engineer and planetary scientist
 Albert Stern (violinist), American violinist
 Albert Gerald Stern (1878–1966), banker and member of Landships committee 
 Anatol Stern (1899–1968), Polish writer
 Andy Stern (born 1950) American president of the Service Employees International Union
 Avraham Stern (1907–1942), founder and leader of the "Stern Gang" (Lehi)
 Avraham Stern (politician) (1935–1997), Israeli politician
 Bill Stern (1907–1971), American sports announcer in the Radio Hall of Fame
 Casey Stern (born 1978), American baseball journalist
 Clara Stern (1877–1945), German-American psychologist
 Curt Stern (1902–1981), German-born American Drosophila and human geneticist
 Daniel Stern (actor) (born 1957), American television and film actor
 Daniel Stern (psychologist) (1934–2012), American psychoanalytic theorist, specialising in infant development
 David Stern (disambiguation)
 Edna Stern (born 1977), Belgian-Israeli pianist
 Edouard Stern (1954–2005), French banker
 Elazar Stern (born 1956), Israeli general
 Elena Stern (born 1994), Swiss curler
 Eric Stern (musician) (born 1971), musician from Portland, Oregon
 Erich C. Stern (1879–1969), American lawyer and politician
 Ephraim Stern (1934–2018), Israeli archaeologist
 Frances Stern (1873–1947), American nutritionist
 Frederick Claude Stern (1884–1967), English botanist and horticulturalist 
 Fritz Stern (1926–2016), German-born American historian of German history, Jewish history and historiography
 Georges Stern (1882–1928), French jockey
 Gerald Stern (born 1925), American poet
 Gladys Bronwyn Stern (1890–1973), English writer
 Grace Mary Stern (1925–1998), American politician
 Hans Stern (1922–2007), German-born Brazilian jeweler
 Harold P. Stern (1922–1977), American art historian
 Hellmut Stern (1928–2020), German violinist
 Henry Stern (disambiguation)
 Herman Stern (1887–1980), American businessman
 Hermann Stern (1878–1952), Austrian lawyer and politician
 Hermann de Stern (1815–1887), German-born British banker.
 Howard Stern (born 1954), American radio and TV personality
 Howard K. Stern (born 1968), American attorney and unofficial husband of Anna Nicole Smith
 Irving Stern (1928-2023), American politician
 Isaac Stern (1920–2001), Ukrainian-born American violinist
 Itzhak Stern (1901–1969), accountant of Oskar Schindler
 Ivo Stern (1889–1961), Croatian lawyer, writer, journalist, director and founder of the "Zagreb Radiostation" (now Croatian Radiotelevision)
 Jacques Stern (born 1949), French computer scientist and cryptologist
 Jacques Stern (politician) (1882–1949), French politician
 Jared Stern, American screenwriter
 Jean Stern (fencer) (1875–1962), French Olympic champion épée fencer
 Jean Stern (art historian) (born 1946), art historian and museum director
 Judith S. Stern (1943–2019), American nutritionist
 Julius Stern (1820–1883), German musician and educator
 Karoline Stern (1800–1887), German opera soprano
 Karl Stern (1905–1975), German-Canadian neurologist, psychiatrist, theologian and author
 Leo Stern (1862–1904), English-German cellist
 Leonard B. Stern (1923–2011), American television producer, director and writer
 Leonard J. Stern (1904–1988), American judge from Ohio
 Leonard N. Stern (born 1938), American business executive
 Leo Stern (1862–1904), English-German cellist
 Leo Stern (historian) (1901–1982) Austrian-German political activist, historian and university rector
 Lina Stern (1878–1968), biochemist, physiologist and humanist
 Louise Stern (born 1978), American writer and artist
 Manfred Stern (1896–1954), international spy and member of the GRU, Soviet military intelligence
 Marcus Stern (journalist) (born 1953), Pulitzer Prize winning reporter
 Marcus Stern (theatre director), associate director of the American Repertory Theater
 Mario Rigoni Stern (1921–2008), Italian writer
 Max Emanuel Stern (1811–1873), writer, poet and translator 
 Melissa Stern, also known as Baby M (born 1986)
 Michael Stern (disambiguation)
 Mike Stern (born 1953), American jazz guitarist
 Mikhail Stern (1918–2005), Soviet dissident
 Milton R. Stern (1928–2011), American professor of American literature 
 Miroslava Stern (1926–1955), Mexican actress of Czech origin
 Moritz Abraham Stern (1807–1894), German mathematician
 Nicholas Stern (born 1946), British economist
 Otto Stern (1888–1969), German physicist and Nobel laureate
 Paul Stern (1892–1948), Austrian diplomat and bridge player
 Philippe Stern (1895–1979), French art historian
 Richard Martin Stern (1915–2001), American novelist
 Robert A. M. Stern (born 1939), architect
 Ronald J. Stern (born 1947), American mathematician
 Ronnie Stern (born 1967), Canadian ice hockey player
 Rudi Stern (1936–2006), American multimedia artist
 Sam Stern (born 1990), British celebrity chef
 Samuel Miklos Stern (1920–1969), Hungarian–British Orientalist
 Selma Stern (1890–1981), German historian
 Tom Stern (cinematographer) (born 1946), American cinematographer
 Tom Stern (filmmaker) (born 1965), film and television writer and director
 Vernon M. Stern (1923–2006), American entomologist
 Victor Stern (1885–1958), Austrian philosopher and politician
 Vivien Stern, Baroness Stern (born 1941), British expert on criminal justice and penal reform
 William Stern (psychologist) (1871–1938), German psychologist, inventor of the concept of IQ
 Stern family, a prominent banking family

Fictional characters
 Ulrich Stern, in the French animated television series Code Lyoko
 Jon Stern, Daniel Holden's Justice Row attorney in the television series Rectify

See also
 Justice Stern (disambiguation)
 Davor Štern (born 1947), former Minister of Economy, Labour and Entrepreneurship in the Croatian Government, businessman and entrepreneur
 Grigory Shtern (1900–1941), Soviet military commander
 Yohanan Petrovsky-Shtern (born 1962), Jewish early modern historian and philologist
 Stearn, surname
 Sterns (surname)
 Stern (given name)

References 

German-language surnames
Jewish surnames
Yiddish-language surnames
English-language surnames

cs:Stern